The knockout stage of the 2011 FIFA Women's World Cup consisted of the top two teams of each of the four groups. It began on July 9 and ended with the Final on July 17, 2011.

Qualified teams

Bracket

Quarter-finals

England vs France

Germany vs Japan

Sweden vs Australia

Brazil vs United States

Semi-finals

France vs United States

Japan vs Sweden

Third place play-off

Final

References

External links
 FIFA Site

2011 FIFA Women's World Cup
2011
England at the 2011 FIFA Women's World Cup
Germany at the 2011 FIFA Women's World Cup
France at the 2011 FIFA Women's World Cup
United States at the 2011 FIFA Women's World Cup
Japan at the 2011 FIFA Women's World Cup
Sweden at the 2011 FIFA Women's World Cup
Brazil at the 2011 FIFA Women's World Cup
Australia at the 2011 FIFA Women's World Cup